Paulo Gustavo Laserna Phillips (born 8 June 1953 in Ibagué, Tolima) is a Colombian journalist, political scientist, television presenter and businessman. He served as the CEO for Caracol TV between 2001 and 2011.

Phillips was raised in Ibagué and belongs to a wealthy and influential family in Tolima, studied International Relations at the Institut d'Études Politiques de Paris, political sciences and senior management from University of Los Andes, and holds a Master of Public Administration from Harvard University. Mr Laserna was a member of the Bogotá City Council and was adviser to Andrés Pastrana during his campaign to the Bogotá Mayorship in 1988.

As a journalist, he worked at Caracol Radio, Q. A. P. Noticias, Noticiero Nacional and RCN TV. He presented newsmagazine En la línea and Los reencauchados (the Colombian version of Spitting Image) in the 1990s. Since 2000 Laserna is the presenter of the Colombian version of Who Wants to Be a Millionaire.

References

External links
 Canal Caracol biography
 Colarte

1953 births
Living people
Harvard Kennedy School alumni
Caracol Televisión
Colombian chief executives
Colombian journalists
Male journalists
Colombian political scientists
Colombian television presenters
University of Los Andes (Colombia) alumni